Nagahama (written: 長濱 or 長浜) is a Japanese surname. Notable people with the surname include:

 (born 1970), Japanese animator
 (born 1958), politician of the Democratic Party of Japan
 (born 1969), former Japanese cross-country skier
 (1936–1980), director of puppet shows and animation
 (born 1998), retired Japanese idol

See also
Nagahama (disambiguation)

Japanese-language surnames